Hello is the debut extended play by South Korean singer Joy. It was released on May 31, 2021, through SM Entertainment, marketed as a special release. The EP consists of six new remakes of songs from the 1990s and 2000s, including the title song "Hello" and pre-released single "Je T'aime". In addition, a number of top musicians participated in the album such as Kenzie, Hwang Seong-jae, Hwang Hyeon, MinGtion, Park Moon-chi, and Lundi Blues.

Background and release
South Korean news outlet Star News reported on May 12, that Joy would be releasing her first solo album later in May. SM Entertainment later confirmed to Newsen that the singer was preparing the project, but did not specify a release date at the time. On May 17, it was announced that Hello will be released on May 31, consisting of six remake songs released from the 1990 to 2000s. On May 26, "Je T'aime" was pre-released, the song is a remake of the same name song by Hey released in 2001. The extended play was released digitally on May 31, alongside the music video for the title track, "Hello".

Composition and lyrics

The album contains six covers of classic songs from the 1990s and 2000s. The title track is a modern rock remake of singer Park Hye-kyung's "Hello" released in 2003. The song features Joy's "cool" vocals in harmony, "cheerful" brass, and a "speedy" arrangement. Its lyrics share a "hopeful" message to forget the past and welcome a new day. "Je T'aime" is a cover of the song released by Hey in 2001. The song was reinterpreted from the track's original "fresh and jazzy vibes" into a "colorful and classical arrangement". The track includes a dance-like piano performance and has an "elegant string melody" that maximizes the "fantastic atmosphere" of it. The lyrics are noted for "Joy's lovely confession with a sweet tone". "Day By Day" is a remake of the song of the same name released in 1999 by the female duo As One. The song is a medium-tempo R&B ballad song with a "groovy" bass rhythm and lyrical sound that "stimulates emotions".

"If Only" featuring Paul Kim, is a remake of a song by singer Sung Si-kyung released in 2002. It creates a "poignant and romantic atmosphere" with a band arrangement and soft flute performance. "Happy Birthday to You" is a medium tempo ballad remake of a song released by Kwon Jin Won in 1999. with an acoustic sound-based arrangement, Joy's vocals "vividly express the happiness and excitement you feel on the way to celebrate your loved one's birthday". "Be There for You" is a solo version of Toy's song released in 1996. The track was reinterpreted into a retro synth-pop using a variety of keyboard instruments such as piano, synths, and melodies.

Track listing

Charts
Joy's special album "Hello" reached number one on the iTunes Album charts of 26 countries and entered the Top 5 of the US iTunes Album Chart. Joy's title track "Hello" reached the Top 10 of the Gaon Digital Chart, with all 6 tracks from her special album debuting on the chart. Joy's title track "Hello" also reached the Top 10 of Billboard's K-Pop Hot 100, with 5 tracks in total from her album also entering the chart.

Release history

References

2021 debut EPs
Joy (singer) EPs
Korean-language EPs
SM Entertainment EPs
Covers albums